The purpletufts (Iodopleura) are a genus of birds in the family Tityridae. It has traditionally been placed in the cotinga family, but evidence strongly suggest it is better placed in Tityridae, where now placed by SACC. These relatively small, short-tailed birds are found in the canopy of forests in tropical South America. Their name is a reference to the purple feather tufts on the flanks of the male, but these are often not visible when the wings are held closed, and females lack them entirely.

Species

References

 
Taxa named by René Lesson
Taxonomy articles created by Polbot